Bunken railway halt is a railway halt located in the southern part of Bunken Plantation south of Skagen in Vendsyssel, Denmark. The halt serves the area's many summer houses as well as the nearby folk high school and golf course.

The halt is located on the Skagensbanen railway line from Skagen to Frederikshavn between Hulsig station and Aalbæk station. It opened in 1890. The train services are currently operated by Nordjyske Jernbaner which run frequent local train services between Skagen station and Frederikshavn station.

History 

The halt opened in 1890 when the railway started.

In 2006 the halt was renovated with a car park, a new platform and a new shelter.

Operations 
The train services are currently operated by the railway company Nordjyske Jernbaner (NJ) which run frequent local train services from Skagen station to Frederikshavn station with onward connections to the rest of Denmark.

Gallery

See also
 List of railway stations in Denmark

References

Bibliography

External links

 Nordjyske Jernbaner – Danish railway company operating in North Jutland Region
 Danske Jernbaner – website with information on railway history in Denmark
 Nordjyllands Jernbaner – website with information on railway history in North Jutland

Railway stations in the North Jutland Region
Railway stations opened in 1890
Railway stations in Denmark opened in the 19th century